James, Jim or Jimmy Cooney may refer to:

James Cooney (Missouri politician) (1848–1904), Irish-American lawyer and United States Congressman from Marshall, Missouri
James C. Cooney, Sergeant of the U.S. Army in the 8th U.S. Cavalry who found large silver and gold reserves in the Mogollon Mountains of Catron County, New Mexico
Jimmy Cooney (1890s shortstop) (1865–1903), MLB shortstop from 1890 to 1892
Jimmy Cooney (1920s shortstop) (1894–1991), MLB shortstop from 1917 to 1928
Jimmy Cooney (Galway hurler) (born 1955), Irish hurler
James Cooney (Medal of Honor) (1860–1903), American Medal of Honor recipient
James Cooney (American football) (c. 1880–1964), All-American football player
 James Cooney (mayor), American mayor of Southport, Indiana
Jimmy Cooney (Tipperary hurler) (born 1914), Irish hurler